Autodromo del Levante is a  motor racing circuit in Binetto, Apulia, Italy. It was inaugurated on 10 June 1989. The circuit has 9 turns. The circuit was mainly used for national events, such as Italian Formula Three Championship, Italian Superturismo Championship and Italian GT Championship.

Lap records 

The official race lap records at the Autodromo del Levante are listed as:

References

External links 
 

Sports venues in Italy
Motorsport venues in Italy
1989 establishments in Italy